Rocky Rhodes is a 1934 American Western film directed by Alfred Raboch and written by Edward Churchill. The film stars Buck Jones, Sheila Terry, Stanley Fields, Walter Miller, Alfred P. James and Paul Fix. The film was released on September 24, 1934, by Universal Pictures.

Plot

Cast 
Buck Jones as Rocky Rhodes 
Sheila Terry as Nan Street
Stanley Fields as Harp Haverty
Walter Miller as Dan Murtch
Alfred P. James as John Street
Paul Fix as Joe Hilton
Lydia Knott as Mrs. Rhodes
Lee Shumway as Henchman Stark
Jack Rockwell as Sheriff Reed
Carl Stockdale as Lawyer Bowles
Monte Montague as Henchman Jake
Bud Osborne as Henchman Red
Harry Semels as Dick Boggs
Silver as Silver

References

External links 
 

1934 films
American Western (genre) films
1934 Western (genre) films
Universal Pictures films
American black-and-white films
1930s English-language films
1930s American films